Muhammad, also spelled Muhammed or Muhamad or Mohammad or Mohammed or Mohamad or Mohamed or in a variety of other ways, is an Arabic given male name literally meaning 'Praiseworthy'. The name comes from the passive participle of the Arabic verb  (حَمَّدَ), meaning 'to praise', which itself comes from the triconsonantal Semitic root Ḥ-M-D. Believed to be the most popular name in the world, by 2014 it was estimated to have been given to 150 million men and boys.

The name is banned for newborn children in the Xinjiang region of China since 2017, as well as for the Ahmadi community in Pakistan.

Lexicology
The name  is the standard, primary transliteration of the Arabic given name, that comes from the Arabic passive participle of ḥammada, praise, and further from triconsonantal Semitic root Ḥ-M-D (praise); hence praised, or praiseworthy. However, its actual pronunciation differs colloquially, for example, in Egyptian Arabic: , while in exclusively religious contexts, talking about Islam: .

The name has one of the highest numbers of English spelling variants in the world. Other Arabic names from the same root include Mahmud, Ahmed, Hamed, Tahmid and Hamid.

Transliterations

The name may be abbreviated to Md., Mohd., Muhd., Mhd., or simply M. because of its utmost meaning, its popularity has meant that it can become hard to distinguish people when there is a multitude with the same name. In some cases it may be to keep a personal name less tied to a religious context. This is only done if the person has a second given name. Some men who have Muhammad (or variant) as a first name choose not to use it, as it is such a common name. Instead they use another given name. For example, Anwar Sadat, Hosni Mubarak, Siad Barre, Zia-ul-Haq, Ayub Khan, Nawaz Sharif and Shehbaz Sharif use their second given name.

Statistics
According to the sixth edition of The Columbia Encyclopedia (2000), Muhammad is probably the most common given name in the world, including variations. The Independent reported in 2014 that more than 150 million men and boys in the world bear the name Muhammad, which would make it the most popular name in the world. Approximately 60% of people named Muhammad live in Middle East, North Africa and Pakistan.

It is sometimes reported that Muhammad is the most popular boy’s name in all of Britain; however, this is based on combining multiple spelling variations such as Mohammed, but not combining spelling variants of popular British names such as Ollie and Olly. Based on statistics for the 100 most popular boys' names in England and Wales, the combined count for Muhammad and Mohammed (6233) was higher than Oliver and Olly (6049), but lower than the combined count for Harry and Henry (7684).

Mohammed and Mohamed were the most popular baby name in département Seine-Saint-Denis (2002, 2008) and in Marseilles (2007, 2009), France. 
Similarly, since 2008 it has been the most popular baby boy name in Brussels and Antwerp, Belgium's most Muslim-populated cities.

In May 2006, it was reported that statistics indicate that some 8,928 Danish Muslims carry the name Muhammad and that in 2004 alone, 167 new-born babies were registered.

In 2009 Muhammad, the most common spelling variant, was ranked 430th in the US. According to the Social Security Administration, Mohammad was ranked 589th, Mohammed 633rd, and Muhammad the 639th most popular first name for newborns in 2006. In the 1990 United States census, the Muhammad variant of the spelling was ranked 4,194 out of 88,799 for people of all ages.

In April 2017, the Chinese government prohibited parents from choosing the name Muhammad as the given name for a child. The list included more than two dozen names and was targeted at the 10 million Uighurs in the western region of Xinjiang.

If all variants of Muhammad are counted, there are 15,723 people in Finland named Muhammad, accounting for 0.7% of the Finnish male population. The most common spelling is Mohamed, accounting for 38% of the Muhammad name carriers.

Given name

Mamadou
Mamadou (mansa), ruler of the Mali Empire
Mamadou Blaise Sangaré, Malian politician, president of the Social Democratic Convention
Mamadou Boye Bah, Guinean economist and politician
Mamadou Kamara Dékamo, Congo-Brazzaville politician and diplomat
Mamadou Dembelé, Malian politician
Mamadou Dia, Senegalese politician, former prime minister
Mamadou Diop (politician), Senegalese politician, former mayor of Dakar
Mamadou Koulibaly, Ivorian politician
Mamadou Lamine Loum, Senegalese politician, former prime minister
Mamadou Lamine Traoré, Malian politician
Mamadou Maidah, Nigerien politician and diplomat
Mamadou Ouédraogo, French Upper Volta (present-day Burkina Faso) politician
Mamadou Samba Barry, Burkina Faso politician, secretary of the New Social Democracy party
Mamadou Seck (politician), Senegalese politician, president of the National Assembly of Senegal
Mamadou Sylla (politician), Guinean judge and businessman
Mamadou Tandja, Nigerien politician, former president
Mamadou Alimou Diallo, Guinean footballer
Mamadou Bagayoko, Malian footballer
Mamadou Bagayoko (footballer, born 1989), Ivorian footballer
Mamadou Bah, Guinean footballer
Mamadou Baldé, Senegalese footballer
Mamadou Camara, French footballer
Mamadou Danso, Gambian footballer

Mochamad
 Mochamad Ridwan Kamil, Indonesian architect and politician
 Mochamad Basuki Hadimuljono, Indonesian bureaucrat

Mochammad
 Mochammad Al Amin Syukur Fisabillah, Indonesian football player
 Mochammad Sanoesi, Indonesian police general

Mohamad
Mohamad Ashiek Salleh, Singaporean convicted killer
 Mohamad Aziz, Malaysian politician
 Mohamad Bazzi, Lebanese-American award-winning journalist
 Mohamad Jawad Chirri, American imam
 Mohamad Elzahabi, Lebanese militant
 Mohamad Haidar (born 1989), Lebanese footballer
 Mohamad Nor Ismail, Malaysian footballer
 Mohamad Kasebi, Iranian actor
 Mohamad Jalal Kdouh (born 1997), Lebanese footballer
 Mohamad Tavakoli-Targhi (born 1957), Iranian-born Canadian scholar, editor, author, professor
 Mohamad Zbida, Syrian footballer

Mohamed
 Mohamed Abdelaziz (1947–2016), president of the Sahrawi Arab Democratic Republic (Western Sahara) from 1982 until his death in 2016
 Mohamed Abdullahi Mohamed (born 1962), President of Somalia from 2007 to 2022
 Mohamed Aboussalam (born 1996), Moroccan basketball player
 Moustafa Ahmed Mohamed Hassan Amar (born 1966), Egyptian musician and actor
 Mohamed Amsif (born 1989), Moroccan footballer
 Mohamed Anwar el-Sadat (1918–1981), Egyptian politician and President from 1970 to 1981
 Mohamed Anwar Esmat Sadat (born 1955), Egyptian politician and nephew of former Egyptian President Mohamed Anwar el-Sadat
Mohamed Abu Arisha (born 1997), Israeli basketball player for Hapoel Be'er Sheva of the Israeli Basketball Premier League and the Israeli national basketball team
 Mohamed Atta (1968–2001), Egyptian Islamist terrorist and ringleader of the hijackers of American Airlines Flight 11 in the September 11 attacks
 Mohamed Bairouti (born 1976), Syrian footballer
 Mohamed ElBaradei (born 1942), Director General of the United Nations International Atomic Energy Agency
 Mohamed Siad Barre (1919/1921?–1995), President of Somalia from 1969 to 1991
 Mohamed Choua, Moroccan basketball player
 Mohamed Diab (born 1978), Egyptian director and screenwriter
 Mohamed Diaby (born 1990), Ivorian footballer
 Mohamed Diaby (footballer, born 1996), French footballer
 Mohamed Diamé (born 1987), French-Senegalese footballer
 Mohamed Emam (born 1984), Egyptian Actor
 Mohamed Elsayed, Egyptian boxer

 Mohamed Fadl, Egyptian footballer
 Mohamed Farah, British Somali runner
 Mohamed Fakhir, Moroccan footballer
 Mohamed al-Fayed (born 1929), Egyptian-born, British-based multi-millionaire
 Mohamed Fayez, Emirati footballer
 Mohamed Hamri, Moroccan painter
 Mohamed Harbi, Algerian historian
 Mohamed Fouad Abd El Hamid Hassan (born 1961), Egyptian musician
 Mohamed Henedi, Egyptian comedy actor
 Mohamed Ibrahim (disambiguation), several people
 Mohamed Kamal Fadel, Polisario Front diplomatic
 Mohamed Kouradji (1952–2020), Algerian football referee
 Mohamed Osman Jawari, acting President of Somalia and incumbent Speaker of the Parliament of Somalia
 Mohamed Osman Mohamud, Somali-born terrorist who nearly set off a bomb in Oregon
 Mohamed Mrsal, Libyan basketball player
 Mohamed Namiz, Sri Lankan cricketer
 Mohamed Niang, Senegalese basketball player
 Mohamed Nur, Mayor of Mogadishu
 Mohamed Ofkir (born 1996), Norwegian footballer
 Mohamed Salah, Egyptian footballer
 Mohamed Salama Badi, Sahrawi ambassador to East Timor
 Mohamed Salem (footballer, born 1940) (1940–2008), Algerian footballer
 Mohamed Salem (footballer, born 1994), Egyptian footballer
 Mohamed al-Shehhi, Emirati footballer
 Mohamed Sissoko, Malian footballer
 Mohamed El-Tabii, Egyptian journalist
 Mohamed El Yaagoubi, Moroccan footballer
 Mohamed Yehia Zakaria (born 1938), Emirati of Egyptian origin pioneer of the beverage industry in the Arab world
 Mohamed Youssef (basketball) (born 1986), Libyan basketball player
 Mohamed Zein Tahan, Lebanese footballer
 Mohamed Zidan (born 1981), Egyptian footballer
 Mohamed II of the Maldives, Sultan of the Maldives

Mohammad
 Arif Mohammad Khan, Indian politician and current governor of Kerala
 Askia Mohammad Benkan, ruled the Songhai Empire from 1531 to 1537 
 Askia Mohammad I (c. 1442-1538), king of the Songhai Empire (1493–1528)
 Mohammad Ahsan, Indonesian badminton player
 Mohammad Amin Fatemi, Afghan physician
 Mohammad Asghar (born 1945), Welsh politician
 Mohammad Ashraful (born 1984), Bangladeshi cricketer
 Mohammad Azharuddin, Former Indian cricket captain
 Mohammad Azizi, Iranian footballer
 Mohammad Bakri, Israeli Arab actor
 Mohammad Barghouti, Palestinian politician
 Mohammad Dawran, Afghan military personnel
 Mohammad Farid, Egyptian political figure
 Mohammad Hatta, first Vice President of Indonesia
 Mohammad Hejazi, Iranian general
 Mohammad Hisham Mahmoud Mohammad Abbas (1963–), Egyptian musician
 Mohammad Hossein Shahriar (1906–1988), Iranian poet, writing in Persian and Azerbaijani
 Mohammad Hussain (disambiguation), several people
 Mohammad Ibrahim Arman Loni (1983–2019), Pashtun human rights activist
 Mohammad Jasmir Ansari, Indian politician
 Mohammad Kaif (1980–), Indian cricketer
 Mohammad Khadem, Iranian wrestler
 Mohammad Khatami (1943–), the President of Iran, 1997 to 2005
 Mohammad Mahseiri (died 2013), Jordanian politician
 Mohammad Mokri,  Kurdish scholar
 Mohammad Najib Abdul Razak, Malaysian Prime Minister
 Mohammad Najibullah (1947–1996), President of Afghanistan from 1987 to 1992. He was assassinated in 1996
 Mohammad Nami, Saudi footballer
 Mohammad Navazi, Iranian footballer
 Mohammad Nazir, Pakistani cricketer
 Mohammad Yousuf (disambiguation), several people
 Mohammad Oraz, Kurdish mountain climber
 Mohammad Panjali, Iranian footballer
 Mohammad Rafique (born 1970), Bangladeshi cricketer
 Mohammad Reza Sharifinia, Iranian actor and film director
 Mohammad Reza Shah Pahlavi as the last Shah of Iran
 Mohammad Rona (born 1985), Afghan-born Danish politician
 Mohammad Sadli, Indonesian politician
 Mohammad Saleh (born 1946), second Deputy Chief Justice of the Supreme Court Indonesia for judicial affairs
 Mohammad Yusuf Siddiq (born 1957), Bangladeshi epigraphist
 Mohammad Sidique Khan (1974–2005), English suicide bomber in the 7/7 attacks
 Mohammad Taghi Bahar (1886–1951), Iranian poet, politician, mathematician, logician, journalist, essayist, and historian
 Mohammad Toaha, Bangladeshi politician
 Mohammad Ali Varasteh (1896–1989), Iranian statesman
 Mohammad Va'ez Abaee-Khorasani (1940?–2004), Iranian cleric and reformist politician
 Mohammad Yousuf, Pakistan Test cricketer
 Mohammad Abubakar Durrani, Pakistani canoeist and filmmaker
 Mohammad bin Salman, Crown Prince of Saudi Arabia
 Mohammad Ridzwan bin Samad, a convicted rioter and gang member of Salakau in Singapore.
 Mohammad Fahmi bin Abdul Shukor, a convicted rioter and gang member of Salakau in Singapore.
Mohammad-Ali Abtahi
Mohammad Ali Ale-Hashem
Mohammad-Ali Angaji
Mohammad Ali Araki

Mohammad Ali Gerami Qomi
Mohammad Alavi Gorgani
Mohammad Ali Esmaeelpoor Ghomsheie

Mohammad Ali Mousavi Jazayeri

Ali Movahedi-Kermani
Mohammad Ali Qazi Tabatabaei
Mohammad-Ali Rahmani

Mohammad-Ali Shahidi 
Mohammad Ali Shomali
Mohammad-Ali Taskhiri

Mohammad-Bagher Bagheri

Mohammad Bagher Kharazi

Mohammed Emami-Kashani

Mohammad Fazel Lankarani
Mohammad Feyz Sarabi

Mohammad Hadi Ghazanfari Khansari

Mohammad-Hassan Aboutorabi Fard
Mohammad Hassan Ahmadi Faqih

Mohammad Hassan Ghadrdan Gharamaleki
Mohammad Hassan Rahimian

Mohammad Beheshti

Mohammad Hussaini Shahroudi

Mohammad al-Shirazi
Seyyed Mohammad Hosseini Zanjani
Muhammad Husayn Tabatabai

Mohammad Ebrahim Jannaati
Mohammad Ezodin Hosseini Zanjani
Mohammad Jafar Montazeri
Muhammad Jafar Moravej
Muhammad Javad Haj Ali Akbari
Mohammad-Javad Bahonar
Mohammad Javad Pishvai
Mohammed Kadhim al-Modarresi
Mohammad Kazem Shariatmadari
Mohammad Khamenei
Mohammad Khatami

Mohammad Mofatteh

Mohammad Mohammadi Gilani
Mohammad Momen
Mohammad Mousavi Khoeiniha
Mohammad Mofti al-shia Mousavi

Nasser Biria
Mohammad Qomi
Mohammad Rahmati Sirjani

Mohammad Reyshahri

Mohammed Ridha al-Sistani
Mohammad-Reza Ashtiani Araghi

Mohammad-Reza Golpaygani
Mohammad-Reza Mahdavi Kani

Mohammad Reza Mirtajodini
Mohammad-Reza Modarresi Yazdi
Mohammad Reza Naseri Yazdi
Mohammad Reza Nekoonam
Mohammad-Reza Tavassoli
Sadegh Khalkhali
Mohammad Sadeq Rouhani
Mohammad-Sadegh Salehimanesh
Mohammad Sadeqi Tehrani
Mohammad Sadoughi
Seyyed Mohammad Saeedi

Mohammad Shahcheraghi
Mohammad-Taher Shubayr al-Khaqani
Mohammad Taqi al-Modarresi
Mohammad Taqi al-Khoei
Mohammad-Taqi Bahjat Foumani
Mohammad Taghi Falsafi
Mohammad-Taqi Ja'fari
Mohammad-Taghi Khalaji
Mohammad-Taqi Mesbah-Yazdi
Mohammed Taqi Morvarid

Mohammad Taghi Pourmohammadi

Mohammad-Taqi Shoushtari
Mohammad Taghi Vaezi
Mohammad Vaez Mousavi

Mohammad Yazdi
Seyyed Mohammad Ziaabadi

Mohammed
 Mohammed Afroz, Indian juvenile rapist and murderer who was one of the culprits of the 2012 Delhi gang rape and murder
 Mohammed Ajeeb, British politician
 Mohammed Ali bin Johari (1976–2008), Singaporean convicted murderer
 Mohammed Ammouri (died 2004), murder victim
 Mohammed Amer, Palestinian-American stand-up comedian
 Mohammed Anas, Ghanaian footballer
 Mohammed Atef, Egyptian al-Qaeda chief
 Mohammed Awad, Iraqi politician
 Mohammed Bouyeri, Moroccan-Dutch Islamic terrorist
 Mohammed El-Bakkar, Lebanese tenor
 Mohammed Dib (1920–2003), probably Algeria's most prolific and well-known writer
 Mohammed Fahim, Former Afghan vice-president
 Mohammed Emwazi, ISIL member
 Mohammed George, British actor
 Sayed Mohammed Baqir al-Hakim (1939–2003), assassinated Iraqi Shia
 Mohammed Saeed Harib, United Arab Emirati animator
 Mohammed Hussain, Indian field hockey player
 Mohammed Abed al-Jabri, Moroccan writer
 Mohammed Al-Kandari, Kuwaiti politician
 Mohammed Kumalia, Nigerian politician
 Mohammed bin Laden (1895?–1968), Yemeni immigrant to Saudi Arabia, and wealthy investor, businessman and patriarch of the bin Laden family
 Mohammed Makhlouf, Syrian businessman
 Mohammed Manga, Senegalese football player
 Mohammed Al-Marwani, Saudi Arabian basketball player
 Mohammed III of Morocco, former King of Morocco
 Mohammed IV of Morocco, former King of Morocco
 Mohammed V of Morocco, former King of Morocco
 Mohammed VI of Morocco (1963–), King of Morocco from 1999
 Mohammed Mossadegh (1882–1967), Prime Minister of Iran from 1951–1953
 Mohammed Said Nabulsi (1928–2013), Jordanian banker, economist and politician
 Mohammed Omar (1959–), Afghanistan's Talibani de facto Head of State from 1996–2001
 Mohammad Reza Shah Pahlavi (1919–1980), the second and last Shah of Iran, ruling from 1941 until 1979
 Mohammed al-Qahtani, Saudi Arabian held at Guantanamo Bay thought to be a 20th hijacker suspect
 Mohammed Rafi (1924–1980), Indian Bollywood playback singer
 Mohammed Al-Salhi, Saudi Arabian middle distance runner
 Mohammed Adil Shah, Sultan of Bijapur
 Mohammed Nadir Shah (1880–1933), King of Afghanistan from 1929 until his assassination in 1933
 Mohammed Zahir Shah (1914–), the last King of Afghanistan from 1933 to 1973
 Mohammed Racim, Algerian artist
 Mohammed Sheikh, English cricketer
 Mohammed Timoumi, Moroccan footballer
 Mohammed Haydar Zammar, German al-Qaeda recruiter
 Mohammed Irfan, Indian playback singer 
 Mohammed Shami, Indian cricketer
 Mohammed Seisay, American football player
 Mohammed Abdur Rahiman, Indian politician
 Mohammed Naseeb Qureshy, Indian geologist
 Mohammed bin Nawwaf bin Abdulaziz, Saudi Arabia's Ambassador to the United Kingdom
 Mohammed bin Faisal Al Saud, Saudi businessman
 Mohammed Vizarat Rasool Khan, Indian educationist and politician
 Mohammed bin Rashid al Maktoum, Vice President and Prime Minister of the United Arab Emirates (UAE), and ruler of the Emirate of Dubai
 Mohammed Siraj, Indian cricketer
 Major General Mohammed Amin Naik, a former Indian Army officer
 Mohammed Shahid, former Indian field-hockey player
 Mohammed Namadi Sambo, Vice President of Nigeria from 2010 to 2015

Muhamad
 Muhamad Ali Aman, Southeast Asian politician
 Muhamad Salih Dilan, Kurdish Poet
 Muhamad Radhi Mat Din, Malaysian football assistant coach
 Muhamad Khalid Jamlus, Malaysian footballer
 Muhamad Husain Kadir, Iraqi prisoner
 Muhamad Kanan, Israeli Arab politician
 Muhamad Aly Rifai, Arab American Internist and Psychiatrist
 Muhamad Hasik bin Sahar, Singaporean gang member and convicted killer serving life imprisonment in Singapore

Muhamed
 Muhamed Alaim, Bosnian football goalkeeper
 Muhamed Bešić, Bosnian football midfielder
 Muhamed Haneef, Indian physician
 Muhamed Keita, Norwegian football striker
 Muhamed Amin Zaki, Kurdish writer
 Muhamed Zulić, Croatian politician

Muhammad
 Muhammad (570–8 June 632) was an Arab religious, social, and political leader and central figure of the world religion of Islam.
 Muhammad ibn Maslamah, (588 or 591–665) was an Arab knight and companion of the Islamic prophet Muhammad. He was known as "The Knight of Allah's Prophet".
 Muhammad ibn al-Hanafiyya (637–700) was an Alid political and religious leader, and also the third son of caliph Ali
 Muhammad ibn Marwan was an Umayyad prince and one of the most important generals of the Caliphate in the period 690–710, and the one who completed the Arab Muslim conquest of Armenia. He defeated the Byzantines and conquered their Armenian territories, crushed an Armenian rebellion in 704–705 and made the country into an Umayyad province.
 Muhammad ibn Abd al-Malik ibn Marwan was an Umayyad prince, the son of Caliph Abd al-Malik (r. 685–705), who played important role in the politics of the Umayyad Caliphate.
 Muhammad ibn al-Walid was an Umayyad Prince and son of Caliph Al-Walid I who ruled from October 705 to 715.
 Muhammad ibn Sulayman ibn Abd al-Malik an Umayyad Prince and son of seventh Umayyad Caliph Sulayman ibn Abd al-Malik.
 Muhammad ibn Yazid ibn Abd al-Malik an Umayyad Prince and son of the ninth Umayyad Caliph Yazid II.
 Muhammad ibn Abdullah ibn Muhammad famously known by his regnal title al-Mahdi, was the third Abbasid Caliph and the most powerful man of world in the 8th century. He ruled from 6 October 775 to 24 July 785.
 Abu Muhammad Musa, was (died 786) was an Abbasid caliph, better known by his regnal name Al-Hadi.
 Muhammad ibn Harun al-Rashid famously known by his regnal title al-Amin, was the sixth Abbasid Caliph and the powerful political leader of the 9th century. He ruled from 24 March 809 to 27 September 813.
 Muhammad ibn Harun al-Rashid famously known by his regnal title Al-Mu'tasim, was the eighth Abbasid Caliph and the powerful Arab military leader of the 9th century. He ruled from 9 August 833 to 5 January 842.
 Abu Isa Muhammad was a son of Harun al-Rashid and Irbah.
 Abu Yaqub Muhammad was a son of Harun al-Rashid
 Abu Sulayman Muhammad, was a son of Abbasid caliph Harun al-Rashid.
 Abu Ali Muhammad, was a son of caliph Harun al-Rashid.
 Abu Ahmad Muhammad, was a son of caliph Harun al-Rashid. 
 Muhammad ibn al-Mu'tasim was an Abbasid Prince and father of the twelfth Abbasid Caliph al-Musta'in who ruled from 8 June 862 to 17 October 866.
 Muhammad ibn Ja'far famously known by his regnal title Al-Muntasir, was the eleventh Abbasid Caliph. He ruled from 11 December 861 – 7 June 862
 Muhammad ibn Ja'far al-Mutawakkil was famously known by his regnal title Al-Mu'tazz, was the thirteenth Abbasid Caliph. He ruled from 866 to 13 July 869.
 Muhammad ibn Harun al-Wathiq was famously known by his regnal title Al-Muhtadi, was the fourteenth Abbasid Caliph. He ruled from 869 to 21 June 870. As a ruler, al-Muhtadi sought to emulate the Umayyad caliph Umar ibn Abd al-Aziz. Historian Khatib states that he adopted perpetual fasting since the day of his leadership until his murder.
 Muhammad ibn Al-Muktafi was an Abbasid Prince and son of Caliph al-Muktafi.
 Muhammad ibn Ahmad al-Mu'tadid was famously known by his regnal title Al-Qahir, was the nineteenth Abbasid Caliph. He ruled from 932 to 934.
 Muhammad ibn al-Mustakfi, was the tenth century Abbasid prince, son of the Abbasid caliph al-Mustakfi (r. 944–946).
 Muhammad ibn al-Qa'im, 11th century Abbasid prince and father of caliph Al-Muqtadi (r. 1075–1094).
 Muḥammad ibn ʿAlī aṭ-Ṭāʾī (1165–1240) Arab mystic, poet, and philosopher 
 Muḥammad Ibn ʾAḥmad Ibn Rušd (1126–1198) Arab philosopher
Muhammad Aladdin an Egyptian leading novelist.
 Muhammad Ma Jian, Chinese Muslim Confucian and Islamic scholar
 Muhammad Nur Aziz Wardana, Indonesian basketball player
 Muhammad Osamanmusa (born 1998), Thai futsal player
 Muhammad Amin Bughra Emir of the First East Turkestan Republic
 Muhammad Ali (1942–2016), American heavyweight boxing champion
 Syed Muhammad Naquib al-Attas (1931–), Malaysian philosopher
 Muhammad ibn Abu Bakr (631–658), Son of Abu Bakr, raised by Ali
 Muhammad bin Nayef (1959–), Crown Prince of Saudi Arabia
 Muhammad al-Baqir 676–743 Shī‘ah Imām
 Muhammad Baqir Majlisi a very powerful Iranian Twelver Shi'a cleric, during the Safavid era.
 Muhammad Ali Bogra (1909–1963), Prime Minister of Pakistan from 1953–1955
 Muhammad of Ghor (1162–1206), Persian conqueror and sultan between 1171 and 1206
 Muhammad Ali Jinnah (1876–1948), born into British India, helped found Pakistan, acting as its Governor-General
 Muhammad Zia-ul-Haq (1924–1988), ruled Pakistan from 1977 to 1988 under martial law
 Muhammad Iqbal (1877–1938), poet born into the British Raj, considered one of the founding fathers of Pakistan
 Muhammad El-Amin (born 1987), American professional basketball player
 Muhammad al-Qayyim al-Jawziyya (?–1350), Sunni Islamic scholar
 Muhammad Naeem Noor Khan, Pakistani al-Qaeda operative
 Muhammad ibn Musa al-Khwarizmi (~780–~850) Persian mathematician
 Sultan Muhammad of Khwarezmia (?–1220), last ruler of Khwarezmia
 Muhammad al-Mahdi (869–?), Last Twelver Shī‘ah Imām
 Muhammad ibn Maslama (589–666)
 Muhammad Ibn Qasim (al-Alawi), Arab fugitive
 Muhammad Mumith Ahmed (born 1984), British-Bangladeshi singer-songwriter and producer
 Muhammad Naguib (1901–1984), first President of Egypt, in 1953
 Muhammad Ali Pasha (1769–1849), viceroy of Egypt, sometimes considered the founder of modern Egypt
 Muhammad Tahir-ul-Qadri (1947–), Muslim scholar, professor, poet and politician
 Dwight Muhammad Qawi (1953–), former world boxing champion
 Muhammad ibn Zakariya al-Razi (865–925), Alchemist, physician, and philosopher
 Jalal al-Din Muhammad Rumi (1207–1273), Persian poet and Sufi mystic from Balkh, now in Afghanistan
 Muhammad Suheimat, Jordanian military general and a statesman
 Muhammad Nawaz Sharif, Prime Minister of Pakistan 1990–1999, 2013–2017
 Muhammad ibn Talha, son of the prominent Muslim general Talha ibn Ubayd-Allah
 Muhammad al-Taqi (811–835), Twelver Shī‘ah Imām
 Muhammad ibn Tughj al-Ikhshid (882–946), autonomous ruler of Egypt 935–946, founder of the Ikhshidid dynasty
 Muhammad Rafiq Tarar (1929–), President of Pakistan 1998–2001
 Muhammad al Warraq (800?–?), 9th Century skeptical scholar and critic of Islam
 Muhammad Yunus (1940–), Nobel Laureate and founder of the Grameen Bank
 Muhammad ibn Zayd (died 900), emir of Tabaristan
 Muhammad Muhammad Taib, Malaysian politician
 Muhammad V of Kelantan, 15th Yang di-Pertuan Agong, Sultan of Kelantan
 Muhammad Subhan Qureshi (born 1959), biologist from Khyber Pakhtunkhwa, Pakistan
 Muhammad Ali Khan Wallajah (1717-1795), Indian Nawab of the Carnatic
 Muhammad Ali Khan Saif, Pakistani politician
 Muhammad Ali Khan Bhutto, Pakistani politician
 Muhammad Sultan Mirza, grandson and sometime-heir of the Central Asian conqueror Timur
 Muhammad Quli Qutb Shah, fifth Sultan of the Qutb Shahi dynasty
 Sultan Muhammad Qutb Shah, sixth Sultan of the Qutb Shahi dynasty
 Muhammad bin Abdulaziz Al Saud, former Crown Prince of Saudi Arabia
 Muhammad bin Saad Al Saud, former Deputy Governor of Riyadh Province and a member of Saudi Royal Family
 Muhammad bin Saud, founder of the first Saudi State
 Muhammad I of Córdoba, fifth Emir of Córdoba
 Muhammad II of Córdoba, fourth Caliph of Cordoba, of the Umayyad dynasty in the Al-Andalus (Moorish Iberia)
 Muhammad III of Córdoba, tenth Caliph of Córdoba, of the Umayyad dynasty in the Al-Andalus (Moorish Iberia)
 Muhammad I of Granada, former Sultan of Granada
 Muhammad II of Granada, former Sultan of Granada
 Muhammad III of Granada, former Sultan of Granada
 Muhammad IV of Granada, former Sultan of Granada
 Muhammad XII of Granada, former Sultan of Granada
 Muhammad I of Khwarazm, former Shah of Khwarazm
 Muhammad II of Khwarezm, former Shah of Khwarazm
 Muhammad ibn al-Qa'im, an Abbasid Prince and father of twenty-seventh Abbasid caliph Al-Muqtadi.
 Muhammad II of Ifriqiya, eight Emir of the Aghlabids
 Muhammad Abdullahil Baqi (1886-1952), Bengali Islamic scholar, writer and politician
 Muhammad Kho Abdullah, Muslim name of Kho Jabing (1984–2016), a convicted Malaysian killer who was sentenced to death by hanging in Singapore.
 Muhammad Syamsul Ariffin bin Brahim (born 30 May 1983), Singaporean gang member of Salakau and fugitive on the run for murder since 31 May 2001.
 Muhammad Nabi, Afganistan cricketer
 Muhammad Omar Ali (1919–2012), Bangladeshi Islamic scholar and translator

Muhammadu
 Muhammadu Buhari, Nigerian politician who served as military dictator from 1983 to 1985, and democratically elected president from 2015

Muhammed
 Muhammed al-Ahari, American essayist
 Muhammed Amin Andrabi, Indian academic
 Muhammed Emin Zeki Bey, Kurdish historian
 Muhammed Yusuf Khan, Indian military leader
 Muhammed Latif, Iraqi major general
 Muhammed Lawal, American professional wrestler and retired mixed martial arts fighter
 Muhammed Mansooruddin, Bengali author
 Muhammed Suiçmez (1975–), German musician
 Muhammed Taib, Saudi Arabian lawyer
 Muhammed Tokcan, Turkish hijacker of the Avrasya in 1996
 Muhammed Hamdi Yazır, Turkish philosopher and theologian
 Muhammed bin Saud Al Saud, member of the Saudi Royal Family
 Muhammed V of Granada, former Sultan of Granada
 Muhammed VI of Granada, former Sultan of Granada
 Muhammed VII of Granada, former Sultan of Granada
 Muhammed VIII of Granada, former Sultan of Granada
 Muhammed IX of Granada, former Sultan of Granada
 Muhammed X of Granada, former Sultan of Granada
 Muhammed ibn Umail al-Tamimi (900-960) Arab Alchemist

Muhammet
 Muhammet Akagündüz, Austrian footballer
 Muhammet Demir, Turkish footballer
 Muhammet Hanifi Yoldaş, Turkish footballer
 Muhammet Kızılarslan, Turkish skier
 Muhammet Özdin, Turkish footballer

Surname

Mohamad
 Mahathir Mohamad (born 1925), Malaysian politician; Prime Minister of Malaysia (1981–2003; 2018–2020)

Mohamed
Abdulrahman Mohamed (born 1963), Emirati footballer
Ahmed Mohamed (disambiguation), various people
Amin Mohammed (born 1996), known online as Chunkz, British Youtube personality
Amina Mohamed, Somali lawyer, diplomat and politician
Antonio Mohamed, Argentine football coach
Binyam Mohamed, Ethiopian detained in Guantanamo Bay between 2004 and 2009
Che Zahara binte Noor Mohamed (1907–1962), Malay activist
Hassan Mohamed (disambiguation), various people
Hussein Mohamed, Somali entrepreneur
Ismail Mohamed (born 1980), Maldivian footballer
Kassim Mohamed, Kenyan Canadian
Magid Mohamed (born 1985), Qatari footballer
Mandy Mohamed (born 2000), Dutch-Egyptian artistic gymnast
Mike Mohamed, American football player
Mohamed Mohamed (disambiguation), various people
Mohd Mohamed, Qatari basketball player
Mostafa Mohamed (disambiguation), various people 
Nadifa Mohamed  (born 1981), Somali-British novelist
Nazar Mohamed Kassim, Singaporean convicted killer

Mohammed
Murtala Mohammed, Nigerian general who served as military dictator from 1975 to 1976.
Amina J. Mohammed, 5th and current Deputy Secretary-General of the United Nations
Bala Mohammed, Nigerian politician and Governor of Bauchi State
Boonaa Mohammed, Canadian spoken-word poet
Fazeer Mohammed, Trinidadian cricket commentator
Ferdoos Mohammed, Egyptian actress
Ghulam Mohammed, Indian politician and former member of the Uttar Pradesh Legislative Assembly
Jawar Mohammed, Ethiopian political analyst and activist
Kausar Mohammed, American actress and comedian
Khaled Mohammed, Qatari football player
Khaleel Mohammed, Guyanese-American academic
Khalid Sheikh Mohammed, Pakistani Islamist militant
Lai Mohammed, Nigerian politician and Minister of Information and Culture
Mesud Mohammed, Ethiopian professional footballer
Mohammed Taher Mohammed, Iraqi weightlifter
Musa Mohammed (footballer) (born 1991), Kenyan football player
Nazr Mohammed, American retired basketball player
Nick Mohammed, British actor, comedian, and writer.
Nick Mohammed (wrestler), Canadian wrestler
Rajaa Mohammed, Kuwaiti actress
Ramzi Mohammed, Somali national convicted of involvement in the attempted London bombing of 21 July 2005
Shaffaq Mohammed, British politician and Member of the European Parliament
Sohail Mohammed, American judge
Syed Mohammed, Indian cricketer
Terique Mohammed, Canadian soccer player
Zehn Mohammed, English football player

Muhammad
Al-Quadin Muhammad (born 1995), American football player
Asia Muhammad (born 1991), American tennis player
Clara Muhammad, born Clara Evans, wife of Nation of Islam leader Elijah Muhammad
Elijah Muhammad (1897–1975), born Elijah Poole, African American religious leader
Idris Muhammad, born Leo Morris, American musician
John Allen Muhammad (born John Allen Williams; 1960-2009), American serial/spree killer and one of the two D.C. Snipers
Khalfani Muhammad (born 1994), American football player
Kiara Muhammad (born 1998), American actress
Muhsin Muhammad, American football player
Rasheed Muhammad, Pakistani tissue seller and murderer
Ruby Muhammad, American centenarian
Shabazz Muhammad (born 1993), American basketball player
Umar Muhammad (born 1975), American football player

Patronymics

ibn
Abu Bakr ibn Muhammad ibn Hazm (?–737), scholar
Ibrahim ibn Muhammad (630–632), the Islamic prophet's son
Qasim ibn Muhammad (598–600), the Islamic prophet's son
Abdullah ibn Muhammad (600–614), the Islamic prophet's son
Abd al-Raḥmān ibn Muḥammad (1332-1406) Arab historiographer and historian
Marwan ibn Muhammad
 Abdallah ibn Muhammad better known as Al-Saffah (r. 750–754) was the first Abbasid caliph and founder of Abbasid Caliphal dynasty.
 Abu Ja'far Abdallah ibn Muhammad better known as Al-Mansur was the second Abbasid caliph from 754 to 775.
 Ibrahim ibn al-Mahdi also known as Ibrahim ibn Muhammad was the Abbasid princess, singer and composer.
 Ubaydallah ibn al-Mahdi, also known as Ubaydallah ibn Muhammad was the Abbasid princess and officer.
 Ali ibn al-Mahdi, also known as Ali ibn Muhammad. was the son of Abbasid caliph al-Mahdi and his wife Rayta.
 Musa al-Hadi also known as Musa ibn Muhammad was the fourth Abbasid caliph from 785 to 786.
 Harun al-Rashid also known as Harun ibn Muhammad was the fifth Abbasid caliph from 786 to 809.
 Mansur ibn Muhammad al-Mahdi.
 Abdallah ibn Muhammad al-Mahdi was the son of Abbasid caliph al-Mahdi.
 Isa ibn Muhammad al-Mahdi, was the youngest brother of Harun al-Rashid.
 Musa ibn Muhammad al-Amin, was the son of Abbasid caliph al-Amin.
 Abdallah ibn Muhammad al-Amin was the second son of caliph Al-Amin.
 Al-Wathiq (812–847), also known as Abu Ja'far Harun ibn Muhammad al-Mu'tasim was the Abbasid caliph from 842 to 847.
 Al-Mutawakkil (822–861) also known as Ja'far ibn Muhammad al-Mu'tasim was the tenth Abbasid caliph from 847 to 861.
 Muhammad ibn Muhammad al-Mu'tasim was the Abbasid prince and father of Al-Musta'in
Ahmad ibn Muhammad al-Mu'tasim, was an Abbasid princess and the patron of Art and science.
 Ali ibn Muhammad al-Mu'tasim
 Abdallah ibn Muhammad al-Mu'tasim, one of the youngest sons of caliph al-Mu'tasim.
 Abdallah ibn Muhammad better known as Abdallah ibn al-Mu'tazz or simply as Ibn al-Muʿtazz was an Arab prince and poet.
 Abu Bakr ibn Muhammad al-Muhtadi, was the son of Abbasid caliph al-Muhtadi.
 Abdallah ibn Muhammad ibn al-Qa'im, better known as Al-Muqtadi was the caliph of Baghdad during later Abbasid period.

bint
Fatimah bint Muhammad (605–632 disputed), the Islamic prophet's daughter
Zainab bint Muhammad, the Islamic prophet's daughter (according to most Sunnis)
Ruqayyah bint Muhammad, the Islamic prophet's daughter (according to most Sunnis)
Umm Kulthum bint Muhammad, the Islamic prophet's daughter (according to most Sunnis)
 Fatimah bint Muhammad was the wife of Arab caliph Al-Mansur.
 Abbasa bint al-Mahdi also known Abbasa bint Muhammad was the Abbasid princess.
 Ulayya bint al-Mahdi also known as Ulayya bint Muhammad was an Abbasid princess and Arab poet.
 Banuqa bint al-Mahdi also known as Banuqa bint Muhammad was elder sister of caliph Harun ar-Rashid.
 Aliyah bint al-Mahdi, also known as Aliyah bint Muhammad was an Abbasid princess.

Teknonymy

 Al-Hadi, also known as Abu Muhammad Musa al-Hadi, was the 4th Abbasid caliph.
 Al-Muktafi also known as Abu Muhammad Ali, was the 17th Abbasid caliph from 902 – 13 August 908.

Fictional
Mohammed Avdol, an Egyptian supporting character from the Japanese manga and anime series JoJo's Bizarre Adventure.
Mohammed, a minor character in Grand Theft Auto IV. He is a cab driver for Roman Bellic's taxi business.

Derived names

Umm Muhammad
 Umm Muhammad bint Salih, was the wife of Abbasid caliph Harun al-Rashid.
 Hubshiya also known as Umm Muhammad was the mother of Abbasid caliph Al-Muntasir
 Qurb, also known as Umm Muhammad was the mother of al-Muhtadi.
 Ashin, also known as Umm Muhammad was the mother of 12th-century caliph of Baghdad al-Muqtafi.

Famous derived names
Muhammad Ali
Mohammad-Reza
Mohammad Taqi (disambiguation), several people

Legality and restrictions

China

In 2017 legislation made it illegal in China to give children names that the Chinese government deemed to "exaggerate religious fervor”. This prohibition included a ban on naming children Muhammad. The legislation was officially intended to prevent "religious extremism" among the country's Uighur minority, but appears to have been a possible act of persecution against the Uighur community.

Pakistan 
The government of Pakistan forbids members of its Ahmadi community from naming their children Muhammad. Al Jazeera reported in 2021 that blasphemy charges had been filed against Ahmadis who wrote "Mohammed" on a wedding invitation in an unspecified amount of instances.

See also
Ahmad 
 Ma, surname used by some Chinese Muslims instead of Muhammad
 Mamadou, West African form of Muhammad
 Mehmed, a Turkish form of Muhammad
 Mohd, shortened version of Muhammad used in South Asia
 Mohannad
 Muhanad
 Yusuf Muhammad (disambiguation)
 Mohammadi (disambiguation)
 Muhammad (disambiguation)
 
 
 
 
 
 
 Arabic name
 Turkish name

Notes

References

Surnames of Sri Lankan origin

Arabic-language surnames
Arabic masculine given names
Bosniak masculine given names
Iranian masculine given names
Bengali Muslim surnames
Pakistani masculine given names
Arab culture
Turkish masculine given names
Мохьмад (Mokhmad), Магомад (Magomad), Магомед (Magomed), Мухьаммад (Mukhammad), Мухьаммед (Mukhammed)
Surnames of Maldivian origin
Maldivian-language surnames
ar:محمد (اسم)
bs:Muhammed
fr:Mohammed
he:מוחמד (פירושונים)
tr:Muhammet